Astropecten is a genus of sea stars of the family Astropectinidae.

Identification 

These sea stars are similar one to each other and it can be difficult to determine with certainty the species only from a photograph. To have a certain determination, in some cases, animals should be analyzed in the laboratory or using genetic testing, but often it isn’t possible. In order to determine the species, with a reasonable margin of error, it’s necessary to observe the appearance of the animal, in particular, based on some typical features described by principal authors that have analyzed over the years a large number of specimens in the laboratory.
The main elements, to determine the various species from photo, are: the appearance of the dorsal marginal plates and spines, the size, the shape of disc and arms. For a good identification by sea photo it is important to take a complete picture of all the subject, a picture of the detail of the marginal plates and to measure as precisely as possible the diameter of the sea star. All this can be done without touching, turning it, or disturbing the animal.
Starfishes have two sides: an upper side called “aboral side” (which is normally visible), and a bottom side called “oral side” (which rests on the seabed).

Species  

 Astropecten acanthifer Sladen, 1883
 Astropecten acutiradiatus Tortonese, 1956
 Astropecten africanus Koehler, 1911
 Astropecten alatus Perrier, 1875
 Astropecten alligator Perrier, 1881
 Astropecten americanus Verrill, 1880
 Astropecten anacanthus H.L. Clark, 1926
 Astropecten andersoni Sladen, 1888
 Astropecten antillensis Lütken, 1859
 Astropecten aranciacus (Linnaeus, 1758)
 Astropecten armatus Gray, 1840
 Astropecten articulatus (Say, 1825)
 Astropecten bandanus Doderlein, 1917
 Astropecten bengalensis Doderlein, 1917
 Astropecten benthophilus Ludwig, 1905
 Astropecten bispinosus (Otto, 1823)
 Astropecten brasiliensis Müller & Troschel, 1842
 Astropecten brevispinus Sladen, 1883
 Astropecten carcharicus Doderlein, 1917
 Astropecten caribemexicanensis Caso, 1990
 Astropecten celebensis Doderlein, 1917
 Astropecten cingulatus Sladen, 1833
 Astropecten comptus Verrill, 1915
 Astropecten debilis Koehler, 1910
 Astropecten dubiosus Mortensen, 1925
 Astropecten duplicatus Gray, 1840
 Astropecten eremicus Fisher, 1913
 Astropecten eucnemis Fisher, 1919
 Astropecten euryacanthus Lutken, 1871
 Astropecten exiguus Ludwig, 1905
 Astropecten exilis Mortensen, 1933
 Astropecten fasciatus Doderlein, 1926
 Astropecten formosus Sladen, 1878
 Astropecten fragilis Verrill, 1870
 Astropecten gisselbrechti Doderlein, 1917
 Astropecten granulatus Müller & Troschel, 1842
 Astropecten griegi Koehler, 1909
 Astropecten gruveli Koehler, 1911
 Astropecten guineensis Koehler, 1911
 Astropecten hawaiiensis Doderlein, 1917
 Astropecten hemprichi Müller & Troschel, 1842
 Astropecten hermatophilus Sladen, 1883
 Astropecten huepferi Koehler, 1914
 Astropecten ibericus Perrier, 1894
 Astropecten imbellis Sladen, 1883
 Astropecten indicus Doderlein, 1888
 Astropecten inutilis Koehler, 1910
 Astropecten irregularis (Pennant, 1777)
 Astropecten jarli Madsen, 1950
 Astropecten javanicus Lutken, 1871
 Astropecten jonstoni (Delle Chiaje, 1827)
 Astropecten kagoshimensis de Loriol, 1899
 Astropecten latespinosus Meissner, 1892
 Astropecten leptus H.L. Clark, 1926
 Astropecten liberiensis Koehler, 1914
 Astropecten luzonicus Fisher, 1913
 Astropecten malayanus Doderlein, 1917
 Astropecten mamillatus Koehler, 1914
 Astropecten marginatus Gray, 1840
 Astropecten mauritianus Gray, 1840
 Astropecten michaelseni Koehler, 1914
 Astropecten minadensis Doderlein, 1917
 Astropecten monacanthus Sladen, 1883
 Astropecten nitidus Verrill, 1915
 Astropecten novaeguineae Doderlein, 1917
 Astropecten nuttingi Verrill, 1915
 Astropecten orientalis Doderlein, 1917
 Astropecten ornatissimus Fisher, 1906
 Astropecten orsinii Leipoldt, 1895
 Astropecten pedicellaris Fisher, 1913
 Astropecten petalodea Retzius, 1805
 Astropecten platyacanthus (Philippi, 1837)
 Astropecten polyacanthus Müller & Troschel, 1842
 Astropecten preissi Müller & Troschel, 1843
 Astropecten primigenius Mortensen, 1925
 Astropecten productus Fisher, 1906
 Astropecten progressor Doderlein, 1917
 Astropecten pugnax Koehler, 1910
 Astropecten pulcherrimus H.L. Clark, 1938
 Astropecten pusillulus Fisher, 1906
 Astropecten pusillus Sluiter, 1889
 Astropecten regalis Gray, 1840
 Astropecten sanctaehelenae Mortensen, 1933
 Astropecten sarasinorum Doderlein, 1917
 Astropecten scoparius Müller & Troschel, 1842
 Astropecten siderialis Verrill, 1914
 Astropecten sinicus Doderlein, 1917
 Astropecten spiniphorus Madsen, 1950
 Astropecten spinulosus (Philippi, 1837)
 Astropecten sulcatus Ludwig, 1905
 Astropecten sumbawanus Doderlein, 1917
 Astropecten tamilicus Doderlein, 1888
 Astropecten tasmanicus H.E.S Clark & D.G. McKnight, 2000
 Astropecten tenellus Fisher, 1913
 Astropecten tenuis (Bell, 1894)
 Astropecten timorensis Doderlein, 1917
 Astropecten triacanthus (Goto, 1914)
 Astropecten triseriatus Müller & Troschel, 1843
 Astropecten umbrinus Grube, 1866
 Astropecten validispinosus Oguro, 1982
 Astropecten vappa Müller & Troschel, 1843
 Astropecten variegatus Mortensen, 1933
 Astropecten velitaris von Martens, 1865
 Astropecten verrilli deLoriol, 1899

Mediterranean species 
Six species of Astropecten currently live in the Mediterranean Sea:
Astropecten aranciacus (Linnaeus, 1758)
Astropecten bispinosus (Otto, 1823)
Astropecten irregularis (Pennant, 1777)
Astropecten jonstoni (Delle Chiaje, 1825)
Astropecten platyacanthus (Philippi, 1837)
Astropecten spinulosus (Philippi, 1837)

References

 Roberto Pillon (2009). Astropecten of the Mediterranean Sea
 Koehler, Réné. 1921. Faune de France. Echinodermes.
 Tortonese, Enrico. 1965. Fauna d'Italia. Echinodermata.
 Tortonese, Enrico. 1934. Annali del Museo civico di storia naturale Giacomo Doria (Volume 57). 
 Emil Edler Von Marenzeller (1875). Revision adriatischer Seesterne.
 Ludwig, Hubert. 1897. Die Seesterne des Mittelmeeres. Zoologischen station zu Neapel.
 Ludwig Heinrich Philipp Döderlein. 1921. Die Asteriden der Siboga-Expedition.

External links 
 Downloadable WoRMS: Roberto Pillon (2009). Astropecten of the Mediterranean Sea
 Downloadable WoRMS: Roberto Pillon (2009). Orientarsi in un mare di stelle
 WoRMS
 Jaselli, Luca. “REDESCRIPTION AND FIRST ILLUSTRATION OF THE HOLOTYPE OF ASTROPECTEN MONTALIONIS (MENEGHINI, 1852) [PAXILLOSIDA: ASTROPECTINIDAE.” Atti della Societa Toscana di Scienze Naturali (2018)]

 
Taxa named by John Edward Gray